Chaetaglaea is a genus of moths of the family Noctuidae.

Species
 Chaetaglaea cerata Franclemont, 1943
 Chaetaglaea fergusoni Brou, 1997
 Chaetaglaea rhonda Stead & Troubridge, 2016
 Chaetaglaea sericea (Morrison, 1874)
 Chaetaglaea tremula (Harvey, 1875)

References
 Chaetaglaea at Markku Savela's Lepidoptera and Some Other Life Forms
 Natural History Museum Lepidoptera genus database

Xylenini